Sarlanka is a village in Rowthulapudi Mandal, Kakinada district in the state of Andhra Pradesh in India.

Geography 

Demographics 
 India census, Sarlanka had a population of 163, out of which 81 were male and 82 were female. Population of children below 6 years of age were 25. The literacy rate of the village is 31.16%.

References 

Villages in Rowthulapudi mandal